Midnight Movies was an indie rock band formed in Los Angeles, California in 2002. Composed of Gena Olivier (vocals, drums), Larry Schemel (guitar), and Jason Hammons (keyboards, guitar), the indie rock trio quickly crafted a moody and stylish sound. They became a major face on the L.A. music scene within a year, and earned a nomination for Best New Artist at the L.A. Weekly Music Awards in May 2003. Just as their self-released six-song EP arrived, Midnight Movies received another nomination for Best Pop/Rock band in spring 2004. Midnight Movies' self-titled studio-length debut was released on Emperor Norton the following August. The group resurfaced in 2007 with Lion the Girl, which featured new bassist Ryan Wood and drummer Sandra Vu, with Olivier handling keyboard and vocal duties and production by Steve Fisk. The band's final show was at Spaceland (now The Satellite) on June 16, 2008 and have since broken up to pursue other projects or to spend time with family.

Musical style
The sound of Midnight Movies conjures a certain Los Angeles - but it's no sun-drenched, glamorized metropolis. This is a decidedly noir L.A., replete with mystery, desire and yearning. On Lion the Girl (New Line Records), their second full-length release, the band explores haunting new vistas and back alleys of the soul, expanding the reach of their acclaimed "psychedelic pop" with an expanded lineup and more expansive songwriting.

Gena Olivier's elegant, beguiling vocals and Larry Schemel's buzzingly urgent guitar lines are, as ever, prominent sonic elements. But two new members, bassist Ryan Wood and drummer Sandra Vu, add considerably to the outfit's musical reach.

Band members
Current members
Gena Olivier – lead vocals, organ, drums
Larry Schemel – guitars
Sandra Vu – drums, flute, vocals, keyboard
Ryan Wood – bass guitar, keyboards, guitars

Former members
Jason Hammons – keyboards, guitars

Discography

Albums
Midnight Movies (2004)
Lion The Girl (2007)

EP
Strange Design EP (2003)Nights EP (2008)

SinglesMirage (2004)Persimmon Tree (2004)Patient Eye'' (2004)

References

Musical groups established in 2002
Musical groups from Los Angeles
2002 establishments in California